The weightlifting at the 2020 Summer Olympics in Tokyo took place in 2021 at Tokyo International Forum.

Competition schedule

Qualification

The number of weightlifters at these Games was reduced to 196, down from 260 in the 2016 Summer Olympics.

Furthermore, many countries had reduced squads, and four were excluded from weightlifting at these Games due to punishments given as a result of high numbers of historic doping offenses.

Changes  
The total gold medal count was reduced from 15 to 14, with one men's event being eliminated.

In July 2018, IWF announced new official weight categories.

Participating nations

Medalists

Medal table

Men's

Women's
During the Women's +87 competition, Laurel Hubbard made history by becoming the first transgender woman to compete in the Olympics.

Controversies

Doping in weightlifting was highlighted during the Games due to historic problems in the sport. Due to corruption, failed reforms of the International Weightlifting Federation, and doping problems, the IOC is threatening to drop weightlifting entirely from the Olympics unless substantial reforms are made to the sport.

Laurel Hubbard became the first openly transgender woman to compete in the Olympics. Her participation in the women’s heavyweight class sparked controversy over whether natal males have biological advantages in female sport.

See also
Weightlifting at the 2018 Asian Games
Weightlifting at the 2018 Commonwealth Games
Weightlifting at the 2018 Summer Youth Olympics
Weightlifting at the 2019 Pacific Games
Weightlifting at the 2019 Pan American Games
Powerlifting at the 2020 Summer Paralympics

References

External links
Results book 

 
2020
2020 Summer Olympics events
Olympic Games
International weightlifting competitions hosted by Japan